In sociology, the term low culture identifies the forms of popular culture that have mass appeal, which is in contrast to the forms of high culture that appeal to a smaller proportion of the populace. Culture theory proposes that both high culture and low culture are subcultures within a society, because the culture industry mass-produces each type of popular culture for every socio-economic class.

Standards and definitions 
In Popular Culture and High Culture: An Analysis and Evaluation of Taste (1958), Herbert J. Gans said that the:

Culture as social class 
Each social class possess their own types of high-culture and of low-culture, the definition and content of which are determined by the socio-economic and educational particulars, the habitus of the people who compose a given social class. Therefore, what is high culture and what is low culture has specific meanings and usages collectively determined by the members of a social class.

History
Physical artefacts from low culture are normally small, cheaply and often crudely made, in contrast to the often grand public art or luxury objects of high culture.  The cheapness of the materials, many perishable, generally means that survivals to modern times are rare. There are exceptions, especially in pottery and graffiti on stone.  An ostracon is a small piece of pottery (or sometimes stone) which has been written on, for any of a number of purposes, among which curse tablets or more positive magical spells such as love magic are common.  Wood must have been a common material, but only survives for long periods in certain climatic conditions, such as Egypt and other very arid areas, and permanently wet and slightly acid peat bogs.  

Once printing (and paper) became relatively cheap, by the late Renaissance, popular prints became increasingly widespread, and cheap texts of street literature such as broadsides and sheets with broadside ballads, typically new topical words to a familiar tune.  These became extremely common, but were treated as ephemera, so that survivals are few.

Much traditional folk music was only written down, and later mechanically recorded, in the 19th century, when nationalist sentiment in many countries made it of interest to middle class enthusiasts.

Mass media

Audience 
All cultural products (especially high culture) have a certain demographic to which they appeal most. Low culture appeals to very simple and basic human needs plus offers a perceived return to innocence, the escape from real world problems, or the experience of living vicariously through viewing someone else's life on television.

Stereotypes 
Low culture can be formulaic, employing trope conventions, stock characters and character archetypes in a manner that can be perceived as more simplistic, crude, emotive, unbalanced, or blunt compared to high culture's implementations—which may be perceived as more subtle, balanced, or refined and open for interpretations.

See also

References 

Popular culture
Culture
Mass media
Social class subcultures
Working-class culture